The Henry Roop was a two-masted wooden schooner built in 1835 in Black Rock, New York, USA. It was also seen as "H. Roop."  The ship measured 65 by 19 by 7 feet and weighed 80 tons. Her last cargo was salt. She was lost in a storm on October 12, 1843, bound for Sandusky, Ohio, USA.  There was no loss of life.

References

Sources: nsp,hgl, wl. and http://www.boatnerd.com/swayze/shipwreck/r.htm

Schooners of the United States
Age of Sail merchant ships of the United States
Shipwrecks of Lake Erie
Maritime incidents in October 1843
1835 ships
Ships built in New York (state)